The 2019 Southern Miss Golden Eagles football team represented the University of Southern Mississippi in the 2019 NCAA Division I FBS football season. The Golden Eagles played their home games at the M. M. Roberts Stadium in Hattiesburg, Mississippi, and competed in the West Division of Conference USA (CUSA). They were led by fourth-year head coach Jay Hopson.

Preseason

CUSA media poll
Conference USA released their preseason media poll on July 16, 2019, with the Golden Eagles predicted to finish in second place in the West Division.

Preseason All-Conference USA teams
2019 Preseason All-Conference USA

Southern Miss had more defensive players selected than any team in the conference for the preseason all defensive team.

Schedule
Southern Miss announced its 2019 football schedule on January 10, 2019. The 2019 schedule consists of 5 home and 7 away games in the regular season.

Schedule Source:

Game summaries

Alcorn State

at Mississippi State

at Troy

at Alabama

UTEP

North Texas

at Louisiana Tech

at Rice

UAB

at UTSA

Western Kentucky

at Florida Atlantic

vs. Tulane (Armed Forces Bowl)

Players drafted into the NFL

References

Southern Miss
Southern Miss Golden Eagles football seasons
Southern Mississippi Golden Eagles football